Aboutaleb Talebi Gorgori (April 10, 1945 – July 21, 2008) was an Iranian bantamweight freestyle wrestler. He won bronze medals at the 1966, 1967 and 1969 world championships and 1968 Summer Olympics.

Talebi lost his father to a sudden disease at the age of 11, and started working at a carpet shop next year to help his family. He married in 1968 and had four children.

References
 

1945 births
2008 deaths
Olympic wrestlers of Iran
Olympic bronze medalists for Iran
People from Marand
Wrestlers at the 1968 Summer Olympics
Iranian male sport wrestlers
Olympic medalists in wrestling
World Wrestling Championships medalists
Medalists at the 1968 Summer Olympics
Wrestlers at the 1970 Asian Games
20th-century Iranian people
21st-century Iranian people